Opinion 2/13 (2014) is an EU law case determined by the European Court of Justice, concerning the accession of the European Union to the European Convention on Human Rights, and more generally the relationship between the European Court of Justice and European Court of Human Rights.

Facts

In 2014, the European Commission asked the full court of the ECJ whether, in its view, the 2013 Draft Agreement between the European Union and the Council of Europe on accession of the EU to the European Convention on Human Rights was compatible with the Treaties.

Opinion of the Court
The Court of Justice held that the EU could not accede to the ECHR under the Draft Agreement. It held the Agreement was incompatible with TEU article 6(2). Its reasons suggested the Draft Agreement (a) undermined the Court of Justice's autonomy; (b) allowed for a second dispute resolution mechanism among member states, against the treaties; (c) the "co-respondent" system, which allowed the EU and a member state to be sued together, allowed the ECtHR to illegitimately interpret EU law and allocate responsibility between the EU and member states; (d) did not allow the Court of Justice to decide if an issue of law was already dealt with, before the ECtHR heard a case; and (e) the ECtHR was illegitimately being given power of judicial review over Common Foreign and Security Policy.

See also

European Union law

Notes

References
  , in Diritto pubblico europeo rassegna online, febbraio 2017
 *  Graham Butler, The Ultimate Stumbling Block? The Common Foreign and Security Policy, and Accession of the European Union to the European Convention on Human Rights, in Dublin University Law Journal, 2017

External links
 Opinion 2/13: Accession of the European Union to the European Convention for the Protection of Human Rights and Fundamental Freedoms

Court of Justice of the European Union case law